Robert Chisholm may refer to:

Robert Chisholm (Canadian politician) (born 1957), former Nova Scotia provincial NDP leader, federal NDP member of parliament
Robert Kerr Chisholm (1819–1899), Canadian politician
Robert Chisholm (architect) (1840–1915), British architect in Kerala, India, designer of Napier Museum
Robert Chisholm (sports administrator), Australian sports administrator
Robert Chisholm (mayor), former mayor of Dunedin, New Zealand
Robert Chisholm (bowls), Welsh bowls international